Bohdan Serhiyovych Kushnirenko (born 2 November 1995) is a Ukrainian professional football defender who plays for Polissya Zhytomyr.

Career
Kushnirenko is a product of the different Kyivan School Systems.

He spent career in the different Ukrainian Premier League Reserves teams, but in March 2016 he signed contract with the Ukrainian First League team Poltava.

References

External links
 
 

1995 births
Living people
Footballers from Kyiv
Ukrainian footballers
Association football defenders
FC Arsenal Kyiv players
FC Metalist Kharkiv players
FC Chornomorets Odesa players
FC Poltava players
MFC Mykolaiv players
MFC Mykolaiv-2 players
FC Vorskla Poltava players
FC Polissya Zhytomyr players
Ukrainian Premier League players
Ukrainian First League players
Ukrainian Second League players
Ukraine student international footballers